Amitabh Bhattacharya (born 16 November 1976) is an Indian lyricist and playback singer who works in Bollywood films. He shot to fame with the film Dev.D with the song "Emotional Atyachar" turning an instant hit. He sang this song under the name "Band Master Rangeela And Rasila". He also lent his voice to this song with Amit Trivedi. He has been continuously writing lyrics for a variety of Bollywood movies since then and has also sung a few of them. Bhattacharya has also maintained a close association with Amit Trivedi since their first film Aamir. He has written the lyrics or sang for most of the film albums composed by the latter. His lyrics have been variously described as "frillfree" and "smartly worded".

A National Award-winning lyricist, he has won the National Award for the song "Agar Zindagi" from the film I Am. He won his first Filmfare award for the song "Abhi Mujh Mein Kahin" in 2012. In his song-writing career he has won highest number of awards, precisely 9, for the song "Channa Mereya" to date.

Notable works

Some of his written songs are "Abhi Mujh Mein Kahin", "Channa Mereya", "Ae Dil Hai Mushkil", "Bulleya", "Kabira", "Balam Pichkari", "Badtameez Dil", "Mast Magan", "Raabta", "Zehnaseeb", "Abhi Mujh Mein Kahin", "Naina", "Khairiyat", "Manja", "Janam Janam" , "Zinda Hoon", "Gerua", "Zaalima", "Sapna Jahan", "Sweetheart", "Namo Namo" "Ghar More Pardesiya", "First Class", "Kalank Title Track", "Param Sundari" etc.

Early life and struggles
Bhattacharya was born into a Bengali family. He completed his schooling from Spring Dale College, Indira Nagar, Lucknow in 1995 and completed his Graduation from Lucknow University in 1999 before venturing out to Mumbai for becoming a singer.

In a prolific interview given to the "Times of India" in 2013, Bhattacharya said that he migrated to Mumbai from Lucknow harbouring dreams of becoming a singer fourteen years ago (1999). He stood in the long queues in front of music composers' office and gave them demo "Audio Cassettes"  to listen to him. But it didn't bear any fruit.

He went up to music composer & director Pritam Chakraborty. It was Pritam who gave him work and allowed him to assist.

During his struggling days, he started writing lyrics for Advertisement jingles to lower his frustration of not getting work. He learned the art of song-writing during those struggling days.

In the year 2004, when his friend Amartya Rahut introduced him to music composer Amit Trivedi, Trivedi and Rahut, who often composed music for television channels, took Bhattacharya as a dummy singer to give presentations of his music. Trivedi also urged him to write rough lyrics. While writing lyrics, Bhattacharya discovered that he had an innate talent of giving words to tunes. Over the years, Trivedi and Bhattacharya became good friends.

His major breakthrough came when Trivedi was working upon the music of Anurag Kashyap's Dev.D, Trivedi insisted Bhattacharya to write rough lyrics. Bhattacharya wrote the lyrics for the songs of Dev.D, and most of its major songs became a hit, thus nearly ending 8 years of his struggle for recognition.

Filmography

As lyricist

As playback singer

Film producer
 The Film (2005)

Awards

References

External links
 
 
 

Hindi-language lyricists
Indian male playback singers
Singers from Lucknow
Bollywood playback singers
Bengali musicians
Living people
Indian lyricists
21st-century Indian singers
1977 births
Best Lyrics National Film Award winners
21st-century Indian male singers